Fourmies may refer to:
 Canton of Fourmies, an administrative division of the Nord department, France
 Fourmies, Nord, a commune in France
 Grand Prix de Fourmies, a bicycle race held in the Fourmies, Nord, France